Saint Abercius is a martyr of the Christian church. The story of his martyrdom has been lost. His feast day is December 5. He is referenced in the Menaea Graeca and the Menologium der Orthodox-Katholischen Kirche des Morgenlandes.

See also
Abercius (martyr), feast day 28 February
Abercius and Helena, first-century martyrs, feast day 20 May

References

Sources
Holweck, F. G. A Biographical Dictionary of the Saints. St. Louis, MO: B. Herder Book Co., 1924.

Year of birth unknown
Year of death unknown
Christian saints in unknown century
Christian martyrs